Flying Wild Hog Sp. z o.o. is a Polish video game developer based in Warsaw and founded in 2009. The company is best known for the 2013 reboot of Shadow Warrior, and its 2016 sequel, Shadow Warrior 2.

History 
Flying Wild Hog was established in 2009. The studio worked on their own Road Hog Engine, a video game engine, which resulted in their first title Hard Reset released in September 2011. In April 2012, Flying Wild Hog released Hard Reset: Exile, a free DLC for Hard Reset. In September 2013, they released Shadow Warrior, which was published by Devolver Digital, with the sequel, Shadow Warrior 2 having been announced in 2015 for a 2016 release. On 7 December 2015, Flying Wild Hog opened a new division in Kraków, led by Michał Kuk.

Flying Wild Hog was acquired in March 2019 by Supernova Capital, an investment firm started by the former CEO of Splash Damage, Paul Wedgwood, and other members from Splash Damage. The acquisition provides financial security for Flying Wild Hog to focus more on its game development. As of November 2019, Flying Wild Hog was working on three unannounced video games: Shadow Warrior 3 with Devolver Digital, Evil West, which would be published by Focus Home Interactive, and what was later revealed to be Space Punks with Jagex. All three, along with Trek to Yomi, which would be published by Devolver Digital saw release in 2022. That year the team also retired the Road Hog Engine in favor of Unreal Engine.

In November 2020, Embracer Group announced that they acquired the company through Koch Media, which will be the parent company.

Games developed

References

External links 
 

Companies based in Warsaw
Video game companies established in 2009
Video game companies of Poland
Video game development companies
Polish companies established in 2009
Plaion
2019 mergers and acquisitions
2020 mergers and acquisitions